We Are Not Free is a young adult historical fiction novel by Traci Chee, published September 1, 2020 by HMH Books for Young Readers. TIME included it on their list of the 100 best young adult novels of all time.

Reception

Reviews 
We Are Not Free received starred reviews from Booklist, Publishers Weekly, School Library Journal, and Kirkus Reviews.

Kirkus Reviews named We Are Not Free one of the best young adult novels of 2020, and TIME included it on their list of the 100 best young adult novels of all time.

Awards and accolades

References 

Houghton Mifflin books
Novels set in San Francisco
2020 American novels
Books about the internment of Japanese Americans
Novels set during World War II